Saint-Jacut-les-Pins is a commune in the Morbihan department of Brittany in north-western France.

Geography
The river Arz forms all of the commune's northern boundary.

History
The Celtic Veneti, and then the Romans occupied the area in Classical times.

In the High Middle Ages, Britons founded several villages, Bodnaga, Brehadou
Guidemais, Bina, Redillac, Brandicoet, and Calleon to name just a few of their towns in the area. The name Saint-Jacut-les-Pins comes from a 6th-century Saint Jacut, who arrived with the British emigrants as a boy and established a church nearby.

The parish suffered heavily in the French Revolution.

Facilities
The municipality has a medical home, Doctors, a pharmacy and a retirement home which provides a course of activities health for seniors.

Educationally, the commune has a nursery and primary school (École Saint-Joseph), a medical Institute and a technology high school (ISSAT).

In sporting terms, the municipality has a Sports Hall, and the dynamism of its numerous sports associations (cycling, hiking, running foot, basketball, football, tennis, motorcycling, water gymnastics, hunting and fishing).

Finally, on the cultural level, the municipality has a media library (Médiathèque Saint-Jacut-les-Pins) and many associations (theatre, choral, foyer des jeunes).

Transport
The commune is located 10 minutes by car from Redon station. Nantes Atlantique Airport and Rennes–Saint-Jacques Airport are respectively at 1 h 15 min and 1 h by car.

The municipality is crossed from East to West by the main rail axis of the southern Brittany. This line Savenay - Landerneau opened up to Lorient in 1862, it allows by Redon relations between the stations of the Brittany cities of the South and Paris by Rennes. The municipality has long disposed of a station and then a train stop, currently these two stations are closed and abandoned. The railway history of the commune will may be rebound with freight activity.

Demographics

Inhabitants of Saint-Jacut-les-Pins are called in French Jacutais.  In 2017, the town had 1,733 inhabitants.

See also
Communes of the Morbihan department

References

External links
 Mayors of Morbihan Association 

Saintjacutlespins